John Cunningham is a football coach and former footballer. He is also known by his nickname "Bugsy".

He is currently a youth development coach with intermediate club Maiden City, and previously served as assistant manager to Paul Kee at Institute, before being sacked alongside Kee at the end of the 2014/15 season following Stute's relegation from the NIFL Premiership.

In his playing days he started off with Mansfield Town and then after a short spell at Sunderland he moved back to Northern Ireland where he was part Derry City's team in the League of Ireland. He also had spells at Bangor, Cliftonville, Coleraine and Institute. Until May 2012 he was the first team manager at Lisburn Distillery.

Previously he was a coach at Limavady United, Derry City and Carlisle United. In April 2002 he quit Carlisle United in protest over the sacking of Roddy Collins.

References

Living people
Derry City F.C. players
Sportspeople from Derry (city)
Association footballers from Northern Ireland
League of Ireland players
Institute F.C. players
Year of birth missing (living people)
Lisburn Distillery F.C. managers
Bangor F.C. players
Coleraine F.C. players
Cliftonville F.C. players
20th-century births
Mansfield Town F.C. players
English Football League players
Association footballers not categorized by position
Football managers from Northern Ireland